is a Japanese football player.

Playing career
After coming runner-up in the J2 player of the Year awards 2010 while playing for Avispa Fukuoka he was installed as Club Captain for the club as they returned to J1 in 2011.

On 2 February 2019, Nakamachi joined Zambian team ZESCO United F.C.

However, within less than a year he was released by Zesco United F.C. in January 2020 for being "deemed as excess and not good enough for the eight-time Super League Champions" having "failed to really adapt and make any impact."

Club statistics
Updated to 2 December 2018.

Honours
Yokohama F. Marinos
Emperor's Cup: 2013

References

External links

1985 births
Living people
Keio University alumni
Association football people from Saitama Prefecture
Japanese footballers
Japanese expatriate footballers
J1 League players
J2 League players
Zambia Super League players
Shonan Bellmare players
Avispa Fukuoka players
Yokohama F. Marinos players
ZESCO United F.C. players
Universiade bronze medalists for Japan
Universiade medalists in football
Association football midfielders
Medalists at the 2009 Summer Universiade
Expatriate footballers in Zambia